The Rocky River is a  tributary of the Savannah River in the U.S. state of South Carolina.

References 

Rivers of South Carolina
Tributaries of the Savannah River
Rivers of Anderson County, South Carolina
Rivers of Abbeville County, South Carolina